Daniel Whyte III is a minister of the Gospel, president of Gospel Light Society International and Torch Ministries International and a bestselling Christian writer.

Biography 

Whyte was born in Brooklyn, New York on September 15, 1960 and mostly raised in New Bern, North Carolina. His father, Daniel Whyte Jr, was a pastor, and gospel singer.

On December 19, 1989, Whyte married Meriqua Althea Dixon. Together, they have seven children.

Writing & Ministry 
Daniel Whyte III is the Essence Magazine national bestselling author of over thirty-four books. He is the President of Gospel Light Society International, a worldwide evangelistic ministry, and Torch Ministries International, which publishes a magazine titled The Torch Leader. He is heard by thousands each week on his radio broadcasts. He is the pastor of Gospel Light House of Prayer International. He is also the founder and president of Torch Legacy Publications.

"Letters to Young Black Men" was named an Essence Magazine bestseller in November 2006.

Several of Whyte's books have also been named BCNN1/BCBC Bestsellers.

References 

1960 births
Living people
Christian writers
People from New Bern, North Carolina
African-American Christian clergy
American Christian clergy
American evangelists
Baptist ministers from the United States
People from Brooklyn
Liberty University alumni
Texas Wesleyan University alumni
Baptists from North Carolina
Baptists from New York (state)